Colin McLay (born 1942) is a retired New Zealand marine biologist. Educated at the University of Otago and the University of British Columbia, he served as an Associate Professor of Marine Biology at the University of Canterbury. He discovered several species of crab, including Desmodromia tranterae, Euryxanthops chiltoni, and Hirsutodynomene vespertilio.

References

New Zealand biologists
University of Otago alumni
University of British Columbia alumni
1942 births
Living people